John-R. Luck (June 12, 1928 – July 25, 1988) was mayor of Gatineau, Quebec from 1971 to 1975 (town of Pointe-Gatineau) and from 1975 to 1983 (city). He was elected as the city's first mayor after a major amalgamation and incorporation in 1975 of the communities of Pointe-Gatineau, Templeton, East Templeton, West Templeton, Cantley, and Touraine. In the same election, residents voted in a referendum for the name of the new city to be le Ville de Gatineau. He is a former employee of the Canadian International Paper Company, where he worked for 30 years. He also served on Gatineau City Council from 1962 to 1971. He was defeated by Gaétan Cousineau in 1983 for re-election.

References

Mayors of Gatineau
1928 births
1988 deaths